Avivato is a 1949  Argentine film directed and written by Enrique Cahen Salaberry with Ariel Cortazzo.  Starring Pepe Iglesias.

Cast
Pepe Iglesias as Avivato
Benita Puértolas
Lilian Valmar
Alberto Terrones
Tono Andreu
Francisco Audenino
Roberto Blanco
Alberto Soler

External links

1949 films
1940s Spanish-language films
Argentine black-and-white films
1949 comedy films
Films based on Argentine comics
Live-action films based on comics
Argentine comedy films
Films directed by Enrique Cahen Salaberry
1940s Argentine films